The term underground church is used to refer to Chinese Catholic churches in the People's Republic of China which have chosen not to associate with the state-sanctioned Catholic Patriotic Association, they are also called loyal church. Underground churches came into existence in the 1950s, after the communist party's establishment of the People's Republic of China, due to the severing of ties between Chinese Catholics and the Holy See.

There continues to be tensions between underground churches and "open churches" which have joined the state-sanctioned Catholic Patriotic Association.

Terminology
The description of an "underground church" reflects language that was made popular during the Cold War, when these churches came about. Underground churches are also sometimes referred to as "Vatican loyalists" because they have attempted to remain loyal to the Pope and the Holy See. There is no established organization structure of underground churches, though they tend to be clustered around a number of Vatican-ordained bishops. However, underground churches would in 1989 form the Bishops Conference of Mainland China as separate from the state-sanctioned Bishops Conference of Catholic Church in China, which was established in 1980.

Chinese Catholics associated with underground churches are often seen in contrast with the Chinese Catholics associated with the Catholic Patriotic Association, often termed "open churches", which are officially independent of the Holy See.

Protestant churches in China which have not jointed the state-sanctioned Protestant church, the Three-Self Patriotic Movement, are generally termed house churches rather than underground churches.

See also 

 Protestant house church
 China–Holy See relations

References

Catholicism in China
Catholic spirituality
Catholic liturgy
Catholic Church in Asia
Catholic Church in China